Thomas Michael Rafferty (born August 2, 1954) is a former American football offensive lineman in the National Football League for the Dallas Cowboys. He played college football for head coach Joe Paterno at Penn State University.

Early years
Rafferty attended Fayetteville-Manlius High School, where he received all-league honors as a defensive lineman in football and also in lacrosse.

He accepted a scholarship from Penn State University, where he played for head coach Joe Paterno and was converted into an offensive lineman. In 1973, he was a part of an undefeated season (12–0). He became a starter as a junior and was named twice to the UPI's All-East team and once to the Football Writers' All-American team in 1975.

In 1988, he was inducted into the Greater Syracuse Sports Hall of Fame.

Professional career
Rafferty was selected by the Dallas Cowboys in the fourth round (119th overall) of the 1976 NFL Draft. As a rookie, he was a backup to Blaine Nye. The next year, he was named the starter at right guard, performing also as a long snapper for field goals and extra points, on a team that won Super Bowl XII against the Denver Broncos.

During this period, center John Fitzgerald nicknamed the Cowboys offensive line as the "Four Irishmen and a Scott", when it was formed by him, Rafferty, Pat Donovan, Jim Cooper and Herb Scott.

Known to his teammates as "Raff", he established himself as one of the better linemen in Cowboys history with an exemplary work ethic, durability and versatility.  In 1981, he was moved to center after Robert Shaw went down with a career-ending knee injury, becoming the anchor of an offensive line that would enable the Cowboys to reach two NFC Championship Games.  Among his memorable moments, he and Scott teamed on the block that cleared the way for Tony Dorsett's 99-yard run against the Minnesota Vikings on Monday Night Football in 1983.

In 1989, he started the first 8 games before rookie Mark Stepnoski took over the center position. He announced his retirement on April 21, 1990. He played in 221 total games for the Cowboys, including 167 consecutive games, which at the time was more than any other Cowboy in history. He appeared in 18 post-season games and 2 Super Bowls (XII and XIII).

Personal life
Rafferty earned his Bachelor of Science in physical education from Penn State University in 1976, and later earned an  MBA from the University of Dallas.

He lives with his wife Donna and their children Michael and Rachel in Keller, Texas, where he is currently a regional sales manager at Sports Supply Group, a Dallas sports supply company. In April 2008, he had a sudden bout of the neurological disorder transverse myelitis. The disorder has caused him to use a walker and wheelchair while he undergoes physical therapy to re-learn how to walk.

References

External links
The 53: Steady Rafferty

1954 births
Living people
American football offensive linemen
Dallas Cowboys players
People from Keller, Texas
American people with disabilities
University of Dallas alumni
Penn State Nittany Lions football players
Fayetteville-Manlius High School alumni
People from Manlius, New York
Players of American football from Syracuse, New York